On 17 October 1987, Rangers faced Celtic in a Scottish Premier Division fixture at Ibrox Stadium, during the 1987–88 season.  The match finished 2–2, but is best remembered for the sending off of three players and the subsequent Court case that took place as a result.

An altercation after 17 minutes between Celtic's Frank McAvennie and Rangers goalkeeper Chris Woods resulted in both being red carded.  Rangers defenders Terry Butcher and Graham Roberts were also involved, with Butcher receiving a yellow card for dissent.  Roberts took over as Rangers goalkeeper for the rest of the match. On 33 minutes Andy Walker scored to put Celtic ahead, and two minutes later an own goal by Butcher doubled Celtic's lead.  Rangers went down to nine men in the second half when Butcher was sent off for a foul on Celtic's Allen McKnight. Despite their disadvantage, Rangers rallied and pulled a goal back through Ally McCoist.  An unlikely comeback was completed by Rangers when Richard Gough equalised in the final minute.  Amidst the celebrating Rangers supporters, Graham Roberts was seen to wave towards the fans, as if he was "conducting" their singing; songs which included sectarian chants.  Three days later, the Procurator Fiscal ordered a Police enquiry into the events of the match.

The Rangers trio of Woods, Butcher and Roberts, and Celtic's McAvennie, were later charged with breach of the peace and appeared at Court.  After a trial lasting several days, Butcher and Woods were convicted and fined, Roberts was found not proven and McAvennie was found not guilty.

Details

See also
 Old Firm

References

1987–88 in Scottish football
Sports scandals in Scotland
Rangers 1987
Celtic 1987
Scottish Premier League matches
1987